Springwell or Springwells may refer to:

England
 Springwell, Sunderland, a suburb of Sunderland, Tyne and Wear
 Springwell Community College, a secondary school in Chesterfield, Derbyshire
 Springwell Estate, a council estate in Tyne and Wear
 Springwell Pit disaster, an 1872 mining disaster in Shropshire
 Springwell Village, Tyne and Wear

Scotland
 Springwells, a neighbourhood of Blantyre, South Lanarkshire

United States
 Springwell Danish Cemetery, North Omaha, Nebraska
 Springwells Township, Michigan, a defunct township in Wayne County
 Springwells, Detroit, a neighborhood in Detroit, Michigan
 Treaty of Springwells, an 1815 treaty between the United States and various Native American groups
 West Vernor-Springwells Historic District, a commercial district in Detroit, Michigan